The Pywiack Cascade is a waterfall in Yosemite National Park within the U.S. state of California. It is located a few miles downstream from the outlet of Tenaya Lake on Tenaya Creek at the head of the steep and rugged granite gorge, Tenaya Canyon. The waterfall can be viewed from Glacier Point, or by a  hike from Olmsted Point, but the canyon is dangerous and the waterfall is unsafe to be reached on foot. The waterfall is highly seasonal. It typically rages in the spring and early summer while shrinking to a trickle by late summer to mid-autumn. 

A small waterfall lies directly below the main drop. Below that, the creek continues over jumbled talus for less than a quarter of a mile (0.4 km) before it plunges over another large waterfall.

To the right of the Cascade while looking straight at it, there is another, ephemeral waterfall that tumbles down a steep granite cliff. This waterfall is of very little volume but is much taller than Pywiack Cascade.

"Py-we-ack" in the native language means "glistening rocks", and the native people applied it to both the creek and Tenaya Lake, due to the abundance of glacial polish in the upper Tenaya basin. The name "Pywiack" has since been applied to Pywiack Dome.

References

External links

Waterfalls of Yosemite National Park
Waterfalls of Mariposa County, California
Horsetail waterfalls